Bent Svele (born 26 February 1962) is a Norwegian former handball player, coach and sports reporter.

He represented the club IF Urædd, with which he won the Norwegian league in 1985, 1988 and 1992, and the Norwegian cup in 1987. He was selected player of the year in the Norwegian league in 1984, 1988 and 1992. During his career, he also played for the clubs Holmestrand IF, Nøtterøy IF, CD Cajamadrid, Málaga and Kristiansands IF, and he coached the club Stavanger IF. He made his debut on the Norwegian national team in 1983, and played 116 matches and scored 343 goals for the national team between 1983 and 1989.

Svele has been sports commentator for the television channel TV 2 Norway since 2000, covering handball events as expert along with reporter Harald Bredeli. He also commented Gladiatorerna together with Mini Jakobsen.

References

External links
TV 2-ekspertens datter (16) er blant Norges største talenter

1962 births
Living people
Norwegian male handball players
Color commentators
Norwegian sports broadcasters
Expatriate handball players
Norwegian expatriate sportspeople in Spain
TV 2 (Norway) people